On Lies, Secrets and Silence is a 310-page, non-fiction book written by Adrienne Rich and published by W. W. Norton & Company in 1979. The book follows the author, Adrienne Rich telling and informing the readers about themes and aspects of her life and work. Other topics which the book cover include the politics of language, racism and history.

References

1979 non-fiction books
American non-fiction books
Feminist books
Non-fiction books about racism
W. W. Norton & Company books
Works by Adrienne Rich